Brett Murray (born July 20, 1998) is a Canadian professional ice hockey left wing currently playing for the Rochester Americans of the American Hockey League while under contract to the Buffalo Sabres of the National Hockey League (NHL). He played collegiately for Penn State University.

Playing career

Junior
Murray played for the Carleton Place Canadians in the Central Canada Hockey League, where he was part of a league championship in the 2015–16 season.

Murray led the USHL in goals in the 2018–19 season, scoring 41 for the Youngstown Phantoms. He was second in the league in points with 76, and was named to the league's First Team at the end of the season.

College
Murray joined the Penn State hockey team at the beginning of 2017.

Professional
Murray was drafted in the fourth round, 99th overall by the Buffalo Sabres in the 2016 NHL Entry Draft.

The Sabres signed him to a one-year AHL contract to play with the Rochester Americans in 2019–20. The team then signed him to a two-year entry-level contract ahead of the 2020–21 season.

Career statistics

Awards and honours

References

External links
 

1998 births
Living people
Buffalo Sabres draft picks
Buffalo Sabres players
Canadian ice hockey left wingers
Ice hockey people from Ontario
Penn State Nittany Lions men's ice hockey players
Rochester Americans players
Youngstown Phantoms players